Epiphragma ocellare is a species of fly in the family Limoniidae. It is found in the  Palearctic .

References

External links
Images representing Epiphragma at BOLD

Limoniidae
Insects described in 1761
Nematoceran flies of Europe
Taxa named by Carl Linnaeus